Bihucourt is a commune in the Pas-de-Calais department in the Hauts-de-France region in northern France.

Geography
A farming village located 11 miles (18 km) south of Arras at the junction of the D31 and the D7.

Population

Sights
 The church of St. Vaast, which, like most of the village, was rebuilt after the ravages of World War I.
 The war memorial.

See also
Communes of the Pas-de-Calais department

References

Communes of Pas-de-Calais